RAI1 is a transcription factor associated with Smith–Magenis syndrome when individuals have deletions of the gene and Potocki–Lupski syndrome when individuals have a duplication. It is known as retinoic acid induced 1.

See also
 Retinoic acid

External links
  GeneReviews/NIH/NCBI/UW entry on Smith-Magenis Syndrome